Utah State Route 237 may refer to:
Utah State Route 237 (1945-1947)
Utah State Route 237 (1947-1953)
Utah State Route 237 (1969-2007)